André Filipe Rio Liberal (born 2 August 2002) is a Portuguese professional footballer who last played as a forward for Tirsense on loan from Gil Vicente in the Primeira Liga.

Professional career
A youth product of Boticas, Boavista, and Chaves, Liberal began his senior career with the reserves of Chaves. He spent the 2020–21 season with the reserves of Famalicão. On 23 July 2021, he transferred to Gil Vicente on a 3-year contract. He made his professional debut with Gil Vicente in a 3-0 Primeira Liga win over Boavista on 9 August 2021.

References

External links
 
 
 

2002 births
Living people
Portuguese footballers
Gil Vicente F.C. players
G.D. Chaves players
F.C. Tirsense players
Primeira Liga players
Campeonato de Portugal (league) players
Association football forwards
Sportspeople from Vila Real District